Mateo is a 1937  Argentine crime drama film directed by Daniel Tinayre, which he adapted from the play by Armando Discépolo. Starring Luis Arata, Enrique Santos Discépolo, José Gola and Alita Román, it was the first successful film of Tinayre's.

Plot
An old carriage-driver who is rendered jobless by cars and progress is so desperate that he becomes a gangster. But when his own son starts a life of crime, he repents and gives himself to the authorities, setting an example for his family and especially for his son.

Cast
Luis Arata as Mateo
Enrique Santos Discépolo
José Gola
Alita Román
Oscar Casanovas 
Tony D'Algy 
Paquita Vehil 
Arturo Arcari 
Antonio Capuano 
Ada Cornaro 
René Cossa 
Antonio Medoya 
Arturo Palito

Production
Domingo Di Núbila says that Armando Discépolo's play was his workhorse, which the public never tired of seeing. An unusual combination of circumstances favored its filming. Natalio Félix Botana founded the Baires Studios and backed Tinayre's project, and although the adaptation was entrusted to Armando Discépolo himself, his brother Enrique, Homero Manzi and director Tinayre were also involved. For the filming, part of Lumiton's studios were rented while Botana built his own galleries.

Botana's financial capacity made it possible to hire a large cast, including Oscar Casanovas, an Olympic boxing champion who played the youngest son, and the Spanish actor Tony D'Algy as the daughter's boyfriend.  The score was composed by Enrique Santos Discépolo with orchestration by José Vázquez Vigo. Ricardo Conord was responsible for the film's art direction.

Reception
Di Núbila wrote about the film:

"Mateo was not an easy pill to swallow in cinema because of its accumulation of depressing facts, fatalistic dialogues and terminal atmosphere, scarcely compensated by happy moments of the young people. But Arata's rapport with his character, Gola's strength and the images of Gerardo Húttula, who had been sent from Berlin to film the activities of German companies in Argentina, pulled it through. Familiar with expressionism, its concepts and techniques, he gave Mateo a style and effects unheard of in Argentine cinema, which were accentuated by Tinayre's concerns in the handling of the cameras. On the other hand, it was the first public success of this director".

References

External links

1937 films
1930s Spanish-language films
Argentine black-and-white films
Films directed by Daniel Tinayre
1937 drama films
Argentine drama films
1930s crime drama films
Argentine crime drama films